The 2015 F4 Japanese Championship was the inaugural season of the F4 Japanese Championship. It began on 4 April in Okayama and finished on 15 November on Twin Ring Motegi after seven double header rounds.

Teams and drivers

Race calendar and results
The calendar was published on 19 January 2015. All rounds were held in Japan and were part of the Super GT events.

Championship standings

Drivers' Championships
Only the best eleven results counted towards the championship. Points were awarded as follows:

Overall

Teams' standings

References

External links
 

Japanese F4 Championship seasons
Japanese
F4 Japanese Championship
Japanese Formula 4